The Islamic Education Union (Jawi: ڤرستوان تربيه اسلاميه; Arabic: اتحاد التربية الإسلامية‎  Ittiḥād at-Tarbiyah al-Islāmīyah), also known as PERTI, is an Islamic mass organization in Indonesia called Shafii-Ash'ari. The forerunner of this organization originated from the Tarbiyah Islamiyah Madrasah Union which was founded by Sheikh Sulaiman Ar-Rasuli on May 5, 1928 in Candung, Bukittinggi, West Sumatra and in its development had become a political party called the Islamic Party PERTI. In the 1955 general election, PERTI gained four People's Representative Council (DPR-RI) seats and seven Constituent seats.

History

Early period 
The forerunner of the Islamic Education Union began with the establishment of the Madrasah Tarbiyah Islamiyah (MTI) in Candung, Agam, West Sumatra on May 5, 1928. MTI Canduang was founded by Sheikh Sulaiman ar-Rasuli titled Inyiak Canduang. On the same day, MTI Jaho was also established by Sheikh Muhammad Jamil Jaho al-Djamili titled Inyiak Jaho. The establishment of MTI was intended as an effort to modernize the educational institutions of the Elderly (traditionalists). This effort had previously been started by Sheikh Abbas al-Qadhi by establishing the Arabiyah School in Ladang Lawas in 1918 and the Islamiyah School in Aur Tajungkang, Bukittinggi in 1924 to match the onslaught of the movement for the development of educational institutions owned by the Young People (modernists) in West Sumatra. The establishment of MTI Candung and MTI Jaho encouraged the establishment of MTI-MTI in other places, such as MTI Tabek Gadang by Sheikh Abdul Wahid ash-Shalihi, MTI Batu Hampar belonging to Sheikh Muhammad Arifin al-Arsyadi, etc.

After the emergence of MTI-MTI in West Sumatra, in 1928 Inyiak Canduang established the Madrasah Tarbiyah Islamiyah Association to connect the MTI-MTI. Previously, the clerics of the Old People in Central Sumatra had gathered in an organization called Ittihad Ulama Sumatra which was founded by Sheikh Muhammad Saad Mungka in 1921.  On 19–20 May 1930, Sheikh Sulaiman Ar-Rasuli gathered the clerics of the Elders to discuss the future of MTI at a conference in Surau Tangah, Candung. Among those present at the conference included Sheikh Abbas Qadhi Ladang Laweh, Sheikh Muhammad Jamil Jaho, Sheikh Arifin Batuhampar, Sheikh Abdul Majid Koto Nan Gadang, Sheikh Abdul Wahid as-Shalihi Tabek Gadang, Sheikh Jalaluddin Sicincin, Sheikh Muhammad Yunus Tuanku Sasak, Tuanku Alwi Koto Nan Ampek, and Sheikh Muhammad Said Bonjol. 

The results of the congres in Bukittinggi agreed to change the Madrasah Tarbiyah Islamiyah Union into an organization of the Islamic Education Union which can be called pti as well as establishing May 5, 1928 as the birthday of the Islamic Education Union. In the management structure, Sulthani Abdullah as the first chairman and Ghazali P. Tanjung as secretary. PTI at that time was headquartered in Bukittinggi. In 1931, in a meeting in Batuhampar, the position of chairman was transferred from Sulthani to Sheikh Abdul Madjid Koto Nan Gadang and the position of secretary from Ghazali to Syahruddin Marajo Dunia. In the following year, a congress took place in Koto Nan Ampek which gave birth to the decision to change the name of the organization to the Indonesian Islamic Education Association (PPII). This name change was rejected by the old clerics of the Tarbiyah Islamiyah Union so that it had caused fiction in the body of the organization plus because it used the name Indonesia, PPII was suspected by the Dutch East Indies government to carry the vision of Indonesian independence, so some of its administrators were banished to Boven Digoel by the Dutch colonial government.  This dynamic led to organizational stagnation until 1934. 

The above events caused the founders, elders and young activists of Tarbiyah Islamiyah to agree to restore the identity and name of the Islamic Education Union and appoint Buya H. Hasan Basri as chairman of the Islamic Education Union. At the same time, Buya Rusli Abdul Wahid proposed the acronym PERTI as a designation and abbreviation of the Unity of Tarbiyah Islamiyah (Islamic Education). Efforts to reactivate the Islamic Education Union were slightly stalled because Buya Hasan Basri due to health problems returned his mandate as chairman of PERTI to the congress.

Thereafter, the congress in Bukittinggi on February 11–16, 1935 appointed Buya Sirajuddin Abbas as the Chairman of the Islamic Education Union. At the same time, the articles of association and bylaws (AD/ART) of the Islamic Education Union were also formulated as well as ratifying the acronym PERTI as an abbreviation of Persatuan Tarbiyah Islamiyah. Furthermore, PERTI published the magazine Soearti (Soeara Tarbijah Islamijah) as a continuation of Al-Mizan magazine.

Development as a political party 

The Islamic Education Union initially participated in the struggle in the political arena by joining the Indonesian Political Association (GAPI) using the identity of the Indonesian Islamic Education Union and also gave the conception of statehood to the Visman Commission in 1939. Entering 1944, the leaders of the Islamic Education Union made a breakthrough by joining the Upper Islamic Council (MIT) in Bukittinggi, an Islamic organization for the whole of Sumatra chaired by Sheikh Muhammad Djamil Djambek, a modernist cleric who in the past had an argument with the old clerics of the Islamic Education Union. MIT was a place to refer to religious issues, but during the Pacific War, the organization was less able to function properly. 

At the PERTI conference on November 22, 1945, it was decided that the Islamic Education Union would enter the political area. The organization transformed into the Islamic Party PERTI, unity in the acronym PERTI also turned into a movement. This change was reaffirmed at the IV congress or muktamar in Bukittinggi on December 24-26, 1945. At the same time, it confirmed Buya Sirajuddin Abbas, who was previously the chairman of the executive board, to be the Chairman of the Supreme Party Council (DPT) and Buya Rusli Abdul Wahid to be the Chairman of the Central Governing Council (DPP). Meanwhile, Maulana Shaikh Sulaiman Ar-Rasuli was appointed as the Chairman of the Central Advisory Council (MPP).  In 1950, the Islamic Party PERTI claimed to have more than one million members. 
As determined at the fourth party congress, held in Bukitinggi from 20–25 May, the party's main policies were:
 to oppose colonialism and to bring about an Indonesia that is independent, sovereign, fair and prosperous
 to bring the people happiness and prosperity in line with the precepts of Islam
 to strive for all Muslims to properly adhere to Islamic principles and to promote Islamic culture
 to endeavor to make Islam the basis of life for the people of Indonesia
In the 1955 legislative election, the Islamic Party PERTI won 483,014 votes, thus obtaining four DPR-RI seats and seven Constituent seats. After the Constituent Assembly and the DPR-RI election results were dissolved by President Sukarno, the Islamic Education Union won two seats in the DPR-GR. Two PERTI leaders were also trusted to serve as ministers of state during Sukarno's reign. The two clerics are Sirajuddin Abbas as Minister of State Safety of the Republic of Indonesia and Rusli Abdul Wahid as Minister of State for General Affairs and West Irian. 

In the September 1955 legislative election, PERTI came tenth nationally, with 1.3 percent of the vote, winning four seats in the 257-seat People's Representative Council, three from Central Sumatra and one from North Sumatra and Aceh. Party leader Siradjuddin Abbas was elected to the legislature. Three months later, it won a slightly smaller share of the vote in the Constituent Assembly election, resulting in the party obtaining seven of the 514 seats in the Constitutional Assembly, which was tasked with drawing up a permanent constitution. In the electoral district of Central Sumatra, where its central office was based, it came second to the Masyumi Party. In the 1971 legislative election, it won only 0.70 percent of the vote and two seats in the legislature.

On May 1, 1965, Rusli Abdul Wahid took full leadership of the Islamic Party of PERTI and established himself as chairman (tanfidziyyah) while changing the word movement in the acronym PERTI to unity. He appointed himself as Rais 'Aam of the Shura Assembly of P.I. PERTI and Buya Rusli Halil as Chairman of the DPP P.I. PERTI. This transition of leadership led to a dispute within the PERTI Islamic Party between Rusli Abdul Wahid's camp and Siradjuddin Abbas's camp. This feud caused Sheikh Sulaiman ar-Rasuli on March 1, 1969 to issue a call to return to the 1928 Khittah, namely the Islamic Education Union as a nonpolitical Islamic educational and proselytizing organization. Although the call has been made, divisions remain inevitable during the New Order era.

Sirajuddin Abbas and Baharuddin ar-Rasuli along with their supporters formed their own management under the name Tarbiyah which later became political through Golkar. Baharuddin ar-Rasuli was elected chairman of the Tarbiyah Executive Board. On the other hand, the Islamic Party PERTI led by Rusli Abdul Wahid continued to participate in the 1971 General Election and managed to get 381,309 votes. The camp, which continued to use the acronym PERTI, along with several other Islamic parties in 1973. Suharto's New Order regime wanted to ensure its continued rule by destroying the old political system, and it put pressure on the parties to merge into two groups, one of Islamic parties and the other of nationalist and Christian parties. As a result, along with the Nahdlatul Ulama the Indonesian Islamic Union Party (PSII) and Parmusi, in January 1973 PERTI merged into the United Development Party (PPP). PERTI's Rusli Chalil co-signed the PPP charter of establishment, and became one of the new party's vice-presidents. On June 26, 1988, the then Chairman of DPP PERTI, Buya H. Nurulhuda, with the blessing of Buya Rusli Abdul Wahid decided to separate PERTI from the political world and return it to a social organization.

Current state of affairs 
The islah between the PERTI camp and the Tarbiyah camp was only achieved through joint national deliberations and deliberations in Jakarta on October 21-23, 2016.  Based on the results of the muktamar, Buya Basri Bermanda as the General Chairperson of PB Tarbiyah was elected as the General Chairperson of the Islamic Education Union, while Teungku Mohammad Faisal Amin as the General Chairman of the DPP PERTI became the Deputy Chairman of the Islamic Education Union. This national level is a continuation of the islah efforts that have been carried out in West Sumatra Province on May 14, 2016 by Buya Boy Lestari from PD Tarbiyah and Buya Duski Samad from DPD PERTI.  Earlier, islah was also first carried out in Southwest Aceh Regency in 2003 by Sheikh Teungku Muhammad Syam Marfaly of PERTI and Teungku Teuku Burhanuddin Sampe of Tarbiyah.

Mass base

Religious beliefs 
The Islamic Education Union was formed by the ulama of the Old People who are still teachingly in the same direction as traditionalist Islamic organizations such as Nahdlatul Ulama in Java. PERTI in amaliah is guided by shafii fiqh, Ash'ari creed, and Sunni Sufism by following the popular orders.  Most of the PERTI members and supporters followed the Naqshbandi-Khalidiyah and the rest were followers of other orders such as the Shari'a in Padang and Pariaman, West Sumatra as well as in Kuta Krueng and Seulimeum, Aceh.

Education 
The main buffer of PERTI as an Islamic educational institution lies in the existence of the Madrasah Tarbiyah Islamiyah (MTI) which has developed since the establishment of MTI Canduang. The MTI curriculum is actually equivalent to the curriculum of Islamic boarding schools in general so that some MTI later changed their designations to Pondok Pesantren Madrasah Tarbiyah Islamiyah (PPMTI) or Pondok Pesantren Tarbiyah Islamiyah (PPTI) so that they were not considered as just madrasahs in the sense of the Ministry of Religion.  In 1939, no less than 400 MTI were established throughout the Dutch East Indies with the farthest reach to Lamakera, East Nusa Tenggara. In its development, several MTI were also established abroad, one of which was MTI Sungai Burung, Balik Pulau, Penang, Malaysia. During the reform period, MTI still accepted many students even though the number of MTI throughout Indonesia decreased.  The MTI curriculum in the early days was purely a yellow book study before it was finally supplemented with general lessons around 1950-1960. 

On January 26, 1969, the Islamic Education Union established Ahlussunnah University (UNAS) in Bukittinggi with its first rector being Buya Ma'ana Hasnutiy, Lc, MA. At that time UNAS only had one faculty, namely the Tarbiyah Faculty. Now the continuation of the college is known as the Tarbiyah Ahlussunnah Bukittinggi College of Sciences. On April 10, 1997, the Tarbiyah Islamiyah Foundation Islamic College (STAI YASTIS) Padang was also established.

Distribution area 
The Islamic Education Union was formed in West Sumatra, then spread to several regions in Indonesia such as Aceh, Riau, Jambi, and Bengkulu.

The Tarbiyah-Perti network in West Sumatra consists of a number of MTI, PPTI, or islamic boarding schools that are sealed. Some of the MTI that still accept students in large numbers include MTI Candung, MTI Batang Kabung, and MTI Pasir. In addition to MTI and PPTI, there are several Islamic boarding schools that do not bear the title Tarbiyah Islamiyah but still have scientific links with Tarbiyah-Perti scholars, such as the Nurul Yaqin Islamic Boarding School which was founded by Sheikh Ali Imran Hasan (graduate of PPTI Malalo) in 1960 in Ringan-Ringan and the Ashhabul Yamin Islamic Boarding School founded by Buya Zamzami Yunus (graduated from MTI Canduang) in 1992 in Lasi Tuo. 

In Aceh, the development of the Tarbiyah Islamiyah Union was inseparable from the role of Sheikh Muhammad Waly titled Abuya Muda Waly, a well-known Acehnese cleric who opened the first branch in Labuhan Haji on May 15, 1942. In the same year Abuya Muda Wali founded Dayah Darussalam Labuhan Haji which later produced several well-known Acehnese scholars with its graduate network covering most of the dayah in Aceh. 

The Tarbiyah Islamiyah Union entered Riau through Kampar at the instigation of Sheikh Abdul Gani, the leading Naqshbandi cleric in XIII Koto Kampar. Buya Aidarus Gani, the son of Sheikh Abdul Gani and a disciple of Abuya Muda Waly, founded MTI Batu Bersurat (now Pondok Pesantren Darussalam Saran Kabun) in 1956, some of whose graduates became the founders of pesantren in Riau.

Organization

Organizational structure 
The organizational structure of the Islamic Education Union according to the articles of association and bylaws refined in the 2016 muktamar is as follows. 

 Central Leadership (PP) for the national level.
 Regional Leaders (PD) for the provincial level.
 Branch Leader (PC) for district or city level.
 Branch Child Management (PAC) for the sub-district level.
 Branch Management (PR) for the village level, kelurahan, nagari, mukim, or so on.

Each management is replaced every five years through deliberation or deliberation. Each level other than PR consists of the following composition. 

 Board of Trustees
 Mustasyar Assembly
 Ifta Assembly'
 Expert Assembly
 Daily Caretaker

PP Tarbiyah-Perti has 17 (seventeen) departments with the following areas. 

 Department of Organization, Regeneration, and Membership
 Department of Sufism and Order
 Department of Da'wah and Information
 Department of Law and Human Rights
 Department of Information, Communications, and Publishing
 Department of Foreign Cooperation
 Ministry of Education and Human Resources Development
 Department of Assessment, Research, and Development
 Department of Women and Family Welfare
 Department of Social and Community Service
 Department of Economics and Cooperatives
 Department of Arts and Culture
 Department of Environment and Plantations
 Department of Agriculture and Marine Affairs
 Emergency Response Department
 Department of Health
 Human Resources Department

Cognate organizations 
After Muktamar Islah in 2016, several Tarbiyah-Perti onderbouws who were still separated according to their old affiliates began to be merged through several national working meetings.  After Muktamar in 2022, PERTI cognate organizations include:

 PERWATI (Islamic Education Women's Union)
 PPTI (Islamic Education Youth Union)
 KMTI (Islamic Education Student Union)
 OSTI-OPI (Islamic Education Student Organization & Islamic Student Organization)

During the Indonesian independence revolution, the Islamic Education Association had several other onderbouws such as Lasykar Muslimin Indonesia (Lasymi), Lasykar Muslimat, The Indonesian Muslim Workers Movement (Gerbumi), the Indonesian Muslim Farmers Movement (Gertami), the Islamic Cultural and Arts Institute (LEKSI), and al-Anshar Scouting. In addition, the Tarbiyah Islamiyah Union has also formed the Islamic Education Student Union (PMTI), the Islamic Education Scholars Association (ISTI), the Islamic Education Unity Legal Aid Institute (LBH PERTI), the Zakat, Infaq, Sadaqah, and Waqf Institutions of the Tarbiyah Islamiyah Union (LAZISWAFTI) as well as the Multipurpose Organization of the Islamic Education Union (SERGAP).

Notes

References

 

 

Defunct political parties in Indonesia
Islamic political parties in Indonesia